Suez Township is located in Mercer County, Illinois. As of the 2010 census, its population was 595 and it contained 277 housing units. Suez Township changed its name from Palmyra Township sometime before 1921.

Geography

Demographics

References

External links
City-data.com
Illinois State Archives

Townships in Mercer County, Illinois
Townships in Illinois